The 1810 Delaware gubernatorial election was held on October 2, 1810.

Incumbent Federalist Governor George Truitt was not eligible for re-election under the Delaware Constitution of 1792. 

Democratic-Republican nominee Joseph Haslet defeated Federalist nominee Daniel Rodney with 50.49% of the vote.

General election

Results

References

Bibliography
 
 
 

1810
Delaware
Gubernatorial